{{DISPLAYTITLE:C25H36O5}}
The molecular formula C25H36O5 may refer to:

 Manoalide, a calcium channel blocker
 Pregnenolone succinate, a synthetic pregnane steroid and an ester of pregnenolone
 Shortolide A, a natural product isolated from Solidago shortii